Chicago Typewriter is a 2017 South Korean television series starring Yoo Ah-in, Im Soo-jung, and Go Kyung-pyo. It ran from April to June 2017, with episodes every Friday and Saturday at 20:00 (KST) on tvN.

Synopsis 
The series depicts three resistance fighters who lived during the 1930s Japanese occupation of Korea, and are reincarnated into the present as a best-selling writer in a slump, a fan, and a ghostwriter.

It is an epic story of camaraderie, friendship, love and betrayal that lasts 80 years.  As the trio of writer, ghostwriter and fan race against time to find the truth of the past that haunts them, will their discovery affect their present?

Cast

Main 

 Yoo Ah-in as Han Se-joo / Seo Hwi-young.
 Choi Min-young as young Han Se-joo
A renowned writer in a slump who has celebrity-looks and tons of fans but is extremely depressed
 Im Soo-jung as Jeon Seol / Ryu Soo-hyun / Anastasia
 Choi Myung-bin as young Jeon Seol
 Jo Min-ah as young Ryu Soo-hyun
A veterinarian and literary fanatic who is an avid fan of Han Se-joo
 Go Kyung-pyo as Yoo Jin-oh / Shin Yool
A ghostwriter with a genius writing style, who has dry humor and loves jazz music and antiques
 Kwak Si-yang as Baek Tae-min / Heo Young-min
 Son Sang-yeon as young Baek Tae-min
 A writer who envies Han Se-joo for his writing skills

People around Han Se-joo
 Jo Woo-jin as Gal Ji-suk
 Oh Na-ra as Secretary Kang

People around Jeon Seol
 Yang Jin-sung as Ma Bang-jin
 Kwak Ji-hye as young Ma Bang-jin
 Jeon Soo-kyeong as Wang Bang-wool
 Jung Yeon-joo as Bang-Jin's colleague	
 Kang Hong-seok as Chef Won Dae-han
 Song Joon-hee as young Won Dae-han
  as Won Man-hae

People around Baek Tae-min
 Chun Ho-jin as Baek Do-ha, Tae-min's father
  as Hong So-hee, Tae-min's mother

Others
  as Song Jong-wook
  as Veterinarian
  as Mi-young
  as Lee Jung-bong
 Park Ji-hoon as Jeon Doo-yeob
  as Jo Sang-chul
  as Hannah Kim
 Choi Kyo-shik as Gardener
 Hong Dae-sung as Bodyguard of Carpediem
 Cha Geon-woo as Butler of Yool's family
 Jung Byung-ho as Yang ho-pil
 Jeon Yi-rang as Jang Ki-bong
 Gam Seung-min as Yang Hyung-sik
 Kang Dong-yoong as Mr. Jo
 Lee Doo-seok as Comrade Kang

Cameos
 Yoo Byung-jae as Deer keeper (episode 2)
 Choi Deok-moon as Jeon Seol's father (episode 3 & 16)
 Choi Song-hyun as MC (episode 3)
 WJSN as Themselves (episode 3)
 Jeon Mi-seon as Lim So-yoon / Madam Sophia (episode 9-11 & 13–16)
 Woo Do-im as Jo Sang-mi (episode 10–15)

Production 
The series is written by Jin Soo-wan who wrote the hit dramas Moon Embracing the Sun (2012) and Kill Me, Heal Me (2015).

This drama marks Im Soo-jung's small screen comeback after 13 years since 2004.

The series was filmed at various places in Seoul - SEOUL SEOUL 3080, Hannam-dong Book Park, Ikseon-dong and Seodaemun Prison History Museum.

Original soundtrack

Ratings
In this table,  represent the lowest ratings and  represent the highest ratings.

References

External links

  

 

TVN (South Korean TV channel) television dramas
Korean-language television shows
2017 South Korean television series debuts
South Korean romance television series
South Korean fantasy television series
South Korean suspense television series
Television series by Studio Dragon
2017 South Korean television series endings